The 2018 Vietnamese National Football Second League was the 20th season of the Vietnamese National Football Second League. The season began on 25 April 2018 and finished on 15 July 2018.

Rule changes
In this season, there are 13 teams divided in two groups in qualifying stage according to geographic region. The top 2 teams of each group will be qualified to final round.
In final round, 4 teams will play 3 matches: 
 Match 1: 1A vs 2B
 Match 2: 1B vs 2A
 Match 3: Match 1 loser vs Match 2 loser

The winners of each match will promote to 2019 V.League 2. 
There are no teams relegated to 2019 Vietnamese Third League.

Team changes
The following teams have changed division since the 2017 season.

To Vietnamese Second League
Promoted from Vietnamese Third League
 Bà Rịa Vũng Tàu 
 Nam Định B
 Vĩnh Long
 Quảng Ngãi
Relegated from V.League 2
 None
Team transfer
 Fishsan Khánh Hòa (transferred from Cà Mau) 
 Phố Hiến (transferred from PVF)

From Vietnamese Second League
Relegated to Vietnamese Third League
 Sanatech Khánh Hòa
Promoted to V.League 2
 Công An Nhân Dân 
 Bình Định 
 Hà Nội B
Team transfer
 Cà Mau (transferred from Fishsan Khánh Hòa) 
 PVF (transferred from Phố Hiến) 
Withdrew
 Viettel B
 Quảng Ngãi
 Mancons Sài Gòn

Teams map →

Qualifying round

Group A

Group B

Results

Group A

Group B

Season progress

Group A

Group B

Final round

Match 1 

An Giang promoted to 2019 V.League 2.

Match 2 

Phù Đổng promoted to 2019 V.League 2.

Match 3 

Phố Hiến promoted to 2019 V.League 2.

References

2018 in Vietnamese football